Aleksandr Sergeyevich Kornilov (also transliterated Alexander, born 12 April 1985) is a Russian rower. He won a gold medal in coxed fours at the 2007 European Championships and a silver in eights in 2016. He placed 11th in the double sculls at the 2008 Summer Olympics. In May 2016, he became one of 14 Russian athletes implicated in doping following the retesting of urine from the 2008 Olympics. His sample A failed the retest, but these results were not confirmed on his sample B.

References

External links
 
 
 

1985 births
Living people
Russian male rowers
Olympic rowers of Russia
Rowers at the 2008 Summer Olympics
European Rowing Championships medalists